Normand Henry Baker (1908–1955) was an Australian artist who won the Archibald Prize in 1937 with a self-portrait. 

He was born in the suburb of Summer Hill in Sydney on 9 July 1908. He won the Archibald Prize when he was 29, which made him the youngest ever winner of the prize. He painted portraits, many of them self-portraits, as well as scenes of circuses and markets. He was also an Archibald Prize Finalist in 1946, again with a self-portrait.

References

External links
 Short article on Normand Baker, archived 2007.

1908 births
1955 deaths
Archibald Prize winners
Australian portrait painters
Archibald Prize finalists
Artists from Sydney
20th-century Australian artists